Sardar Patel University of Police, Security and Criminal Justice is a state university located at Jodhpur, Rajasthan, India.

History
The Sardar Patel University of Police, Security and Criminal Justice was established in 2012 by the Government of Rajasthan through Sardar Patel University of Police, Security and Criminal Justice, Jodhpur Act, 2012, named after Vallabhbhai Patel, the first Deputy Prime Minister of India.

In 2015, the Sardar Patel University of Police introduced the LL.M./M.A. in criminal law, and co-organized the first counter-terrorism conference in the country. In 2016, it opened a new class to study national, international and transnational criminal law.

Governance
M. L. Kumawat was the first Vice Chancellor (VC) of the university and served until 2015. Bhupendra Singh served as officer on special duty (OSD) for the universality since 2012, before being appointed Pro Vice Chancellor in 2013. He then served as VC of the university in additional charge following Kumawat. In 2018 N.R.K. Reddy was appointed Pro Vice Chancellor and also served as VC in additional charge. Alok Tripathi was appointed as second VC of the University in October 2020.

Academics
The Sardar Patel University of Police, Security and Criminal Justice focuses on teaching and research in the fields of police science, social sciences, criminal law, criminology, public safety, national security and related areas.

Faculties
Faculty of Criminal Justice and Police Studies
Faculty of Social Science And Humanities
Faculty Of Public Safety and National Security
Faculty of Science, Technology & Forensics
Faculty of Management & Behavioural Science
Visiting Faculty

References

External links

Universities in Jodhpur
Educational institutions established in 2012
2012 establishments in Rajasthan
Law enforcement in India